The JO-ZERO is an agile humanoid robot designed by manga artist Minoru Kamiya, who created the anime show Act On!. The robot, manufactured by Himeji Softworks, was presented at the International Robot Exhibition 2009.

References
 Nakamura's JO-ZERO robot sets a new performance standard (Video)
 Serkan Toto (December 30, 2009) JO-ZERO: Super-agile, super-cool mini humanoid (video) CrunchGear
 JO-ZERO could be in next Transformers movie, as himself
 http://robot.watch.impress.co.jp/docs/news/20090706_300316.html 
 https://web.archive.org/web/20090713013033/http://journal.mycom.co.jp/articles/2009/07/10/jo-zero_debut/index.html 

Bipedal humanoid robots
2009 robots
Robots of Japan